The Blackrock Rugby Festival (also known as the St. Mary's Blackrock Festival or simply Blackrock), is an annual school's rugby union competition held at St. Mary's School in Nairobi, Kenya, usually around 17 and 23 May. It is claimed to be the biggest high school tournament in East Africa. The first tournament took place in 1983, and also featured a club rugby competition.  The tournament is used by Kenyan rugby clubs to scout for new and upcoming players.

St. Mary's School was founded in 1939 and, for many years, was run by the Holy Ghost Fathers of Blackrock College in Ireland, hence the name of the tournament. The school uses the same badge as Blackrock College and their rugby team also wear the same blue and white hoops as their sister institution.  A further reminder of the strong Irish influence on the school is the former name of their playing fields where the tournament takes place, Lansdowne Road (named after the Irish national rugby stadium in Dublin).

Competition

The tournament is played in a round-robin format, normally with 24 teams divided into 8 groups of 3 teams each.

The top team of each group qualifies for the quarter-finals of the Main Cup, while the second and third-placed team of each group qualify for the quarter-finals of the Plate and Bowl Cup respectively.

Recently, a girls' tournament was introduced to run alongside the main boys' tournament. In the girls' tournament, there are 12 teams that compete for the cup.

In 2022, the competition was played in a seven-a-side format instead of the regular fifteen-a-side format.

Rules
For all matches before the final, points are given as follows:
A try is automatically 7 points and no conversion is taken.
A penalty or a drop goal is 5 points.

For the final, all normal rugby union rules apply.

Knockout stage
Teams in each group advance to the Main Cup, Plate and Bowl Cup as shown below.

Public influence
Entrance for spectators was free until 2012, when tickets began to be produced and sold for KSh.300/=, and later KSh.100/=. This was in response to several security concerns that arose in the past few tournaments, especially thefts and disturbing the peace.

The tournament usually attracts crowds of about 2,000 people each year.

Previous winners

References

 
Rugby union competitions in Kenya
Sport in Nairobi
High school rugby union
1983 establishments in Kenya
Recurring sporting events established in 1983
Annual events in Kenya